ZMB may refer to:

 The Berlin Zoological Museum, which changed its name to Museum für Naturkunde ('Natural History Museum') in 1889;
 The Zürcher Museums-Bahn, a heritage railway in the Swiss city of Zurich;
 ZMB, a country code of Zambia;
 ZMB GmbH (Securing Energy for Europe), a former subsidiary of Gazprom.